Caprarola is a town and comune in the province of Viterbo, in the Lazio region of central Italy.  The village is situated in a range of volcanic hills known as the Cimini Mounts.

The town is home to the large Renaissance mansion or villa which dominates the surrounding country-side, Villa Farnese (or Villa Caprarola). Not to be confused with the Palazzo Farnese in Rome, it was initially built as a fortress, as the town and the surrounding area was a feud of the House of Farnese, by the cardinal Alessandro Farnese senio in 1530, according to a project of the architect Antonio da Sangallo the Younger. After only four years the project came to a halt when the cardinal was elected pope in 1534 under the name Paul III.

Filmography
Villa Farnese was used as film location in many movies and TV series, such as Medici: Masters of Florence, The Man From Uncle and The Two Popes.

References

Municipalities of the Province of Viterbo
Baroque architecture in Lazio
Renaissance architecture in Lazio